Elections to Moyle District Council were held on 5 May 2011 on the same day as the other Northern Irish local government elections. The election used three district electoral areas to elect a total of 15 councillors.

Election results

Note: "Votes" are the first preference votes.

Districts summary

|- class="unsortable" align="centre"
!rowspan=2 align="left"|Ward
! % 
!Cllrs
! % 
!Cllrs
! %
!Cllrs
! %
!Cllrs
! % 
!Cllrs
! % 
!Cllrs
!rowspan=2|TotalCllrs
|- class="unsortable" align="center"
!colspan=2 bgcolor="" | Sinn Féin
!colspan=2 bgcolor="" | UUP
!colspan=2 bgcolor="" | SDLP
!colspan=2 bgcolor="" | DUP
!colspan=2 bgcolor="" | TUV
!colspan=2 bgcolor="white"| Others
|-
|align="left"|Ballycastle
|21.0
|0
|11.6
|1
|17.0
|1
|5.5
|0
|0.0
|0
|bgcolor="#DDDDDD"|44.9
|bgcolor="#DDDDDD"|2
|5
|-
|align="left"|Giant's Causeway
|0.0
|0
|39.6
|2
|0.0
|0
|bgcolor="#D46A4C"|39.7
|bgcolor="#D46A4C"|2
|10.2
|1
|10.5
|0
|5
|-
|align="left"|The Glens
|bgcolor="#008800"|35.7
|bgcolor="#008800"|2
|0.0
|0
|25.6
|1
|7.4
|0
|0.0
|0
|31.3
|2
|5
|-'
|-
|- class="unsortable" class="sortbottom" style="background:#C9C9C9"
|align="left"| Total
|21.4
|3
|14.1
|3
|16.1
|2
|14.8
|2
|2.5
|1
|31.1
|4
|15
|-
|}

Districts results

Ballycastle

2005: 2 x Sinn Féin, 1 x SDLP, 1 x UUP, 1 x Independent
2011: 2 x Independent, 1 x Sinn Féin, 1 x SDLP, 1 x UUP
2005-2011 Change: Independent gain from Sinn Féin

Giant's Causeway

2005: 2 x DUP, 2 x UUP, 1 x Independent
2011: 2 x DUP, 2 x UUP, 1 x TUV
2005-2011 Change: TUV gain from Independent

The Glens

2005: 2 x Sinn Féin, 2 x SDLP, 1 x Independent
2011: 2 x Sinn Féin, 2 x Independent, 1 x SDLP
2005-2011 Change: Independent gain from SDLP

References

Moyle District Council elections
Moyle